Petr Šnapka (born 22 September 1943) is a Czech economist and university professor.

Life 
Šnapka graduated 1967 from the Technical University of Ostrava at Faculty of Mining and Geology (FMG) in the field of Economics and Organization in the mining industry. 1967/1968 he works as system analyst at OKD computer center in Ostrava. 1969 he became Assistant Professor for research at VŠB-TUO (FMG), from 1971 to 1976 as Assistant Professor for economics (FMG). 1972 he earned his Ph.D. in the field of economics of industrial sectors at the VŠB-Technical University of Ostrava.

Petr Šnapka became 1978 Associate Professor at Department of Economics and Management; 1986 he was appointed to Head of Department of Economics and Management in the Mining Industry. After making his habilitation treatise (DrSc.) in 1989 he was appointed 1990 to Full Professor and Head of Economics and Management at the Faculty Mining and Geology. Since 1996 he taught as a professor at the VŠB-TUO at the Faculty of Economics in the Department of Management. He was long-time Dean at the "Institute of doctoral and managerial studies" (IDMS) at TUO. He is member of the academic council of School of Business Administration in Karvina, part of the Silesian University in Opava.

Since 1996 he is in addition to his professorship vice president of finance of OKD, Důl Hlubina, Ostrava (mining industry).

The research activity of Prof. Ing. Petr Šnapka DrSc. are company management and economics, management of planning and organization of the economics, management processes and engineering management, economic modelling particularly in financial/budgetary maths, risk management and forecasting methods. He is an author of four books, 40 textbooks, more than 80 research projects and numerous articles in journals and conference papers from national and international conferences.

External links
 

1943 births
Living people
People from Ostrava
20th-century Czech economists
Academic staff of the Technical University of Ostrava
Czechoslovak economists
21st-century Czech economists